In the First  Oda Nobuhide defeated Imagawa Yoshimoto, setting the stage for his son, Oda Nobunaga, to become one of Japan's greatest warlords. Despite the defeat, later in 1548, Imagawa defeated Nobuhide in the Second Battle of Azukizaka and continued to expand his territory until 1560, when he faced Nobunaga and was killed in the Battle of Okehazama.

In response to Oda moves into Western Mikawa, Imagawa Yoshimoto moved forces into Ikutahara in the 8th month of 1542. Oda Nobuhide responded to this by leaving his position at Anjô castle and crossing the Yahagi river taking up a position at Kamiwada, and in the 10th month, engaged in battle at Azukizaka, southeast of Okazaki castle. 

The Imagawa vanguard was led by a warrior by the name of Yuhara of Suruga, and Nobuhide was joined by his brothers Nobuyasu, Nobumitsu, and Nobuzane. The battle was quickly won by the Oda side, with credit given to seven Samurai, known as the "Seven Spears of Azukizaka".

Oda's "Seven Spears of Azukizaka"
During the First Battle of Azukizaka in 1542, seven of Oda Nobuhide's men so distinguished themselves they became known as the "Seven Spears of Azukizaka" (小豆坂七本槍). The seven Samurai were,
Oda Nobumitsu
Oda Nobufusa
Okada Shigeyoshi
Sassa Masatsugu
Sassa Magosuke
Nakano Shigeyoshi
Shimokata Sadakiyo

See also
Battle of Azukizaka (1564)

References

2. The "Chronicle of Lord Nobunaga" book.

1542 in Japan
Azukizaka 1542
Azukizaka 1542